Theodore R. Bogan (May 10, 1909 – January 29, 1990) was an American country blues guitarist, singer and songwriter, best known for his work with Howard Armstrong and Carl Martin. His career spanned over 50 years. His finger-picking guitar style was much admired. He played in various string bands for most of his career, including Martin, Bogan & Armstrong (or Martin, Bogan & the Armstrongs).

Biography
Bogan was born in Spartanburg, South Carolina. He learned to play a finger-picking style of guitar in his adolescence, being initially influenced by Leroy Carr and Blind Blake, both of whom he heard on his family's radio set. It is claimed that he began performing in a medicine show, and appeared on radio broadcasts in Spartanburg. After meeting Carl Martin, Bogan moved to Knoxville, Tennessee. They played extensively on street corners, with Bogan enhancing his guitar playing to incorporate flatpicking. His first recordings were made for Bluebird Records in 1934, for which he performed with Howard Armstrong, whom he had met four years earlier. They recorded "State Street Rag" and "Ted's Stomp" for Bluebird, with Armstrong using the stage name Louie Bluie, which had been given to him by a fan.

In the 1940s, they appeared as part of the Four Keys, who toured in the Midwest. Later, in Chicago, they recorded as the backing group for Bumble Bee Slim. Their group changed its name to the Tennessee Chocolate Drops, designed to exploit opportunities in both the race record market and the audience for hillbilly music on radio and records. More often joined by Howard Armstrong, they performed for years in several acoustic string band formats under different names. The group played a mixture of musical genres and styles, including the blues, jazz, pop, country, and various non-English favorite melodies. The introduction of jukeboxes and electric musical ensembles reduced their popularity.

In the 1970s, a revival of interest in string bands saw Bogan and Martin still based in Chicago. In 1974, Martin, Bogan & Armstrong played at the 36th National Folk Festival, at Wolf Trap Farm Park in Vienna, Virginia. Martin died in 1979, but Bogan and Armstrong continued until Bogan's death.

Bogan and Armstrong appeared and performed in the 1985 documentary film Louie Bluie, directed by Terry Zwigoff, who had been inspired to seek them out after listening to "State Street Rag". The long-term relationship between Bogan and Armstrong was often frayed, rivalling the situation between Brownie McGhee and Sonny Terry.

Bogan died in Detroit, Michigan, in January 1990, aged 80.

Partial discography

See also
List of country blues musicians

References

1909 births
1990 deaths
American blues singers
Country blues singers
Country blues musicians
20th-century African-American male singers
American blues guitarists
Songwriters from South Carolina
Musicians from Spartanburg, South Carolina
Blues revival musicians
20th-century American singers
20th-century American guitarists
Guitarists from South Carolina
American male guitarists
20th-century American male singers
African-American songwriters
African-American guitarists
American male songwriters